West Grove Township is a township in Davis County, Iowa, USA.  As of the 2000 census, its population was 456.

History
West Grove Township was organized in 1874.

Geography
West Grove Township covers an area of 36.54 square miles (94.65 square kilometers); of this, 0.1 square miles (0.27 square kilometers) or 0.29 percent is water.

Unincorporated towns
 West Grove
(This list is based on USGS data and may include former settlements.)

Adjacent townships
 Fox River Township (north)
 Cleveland Township (east)
 Wyacondah Township (southeast)
 Fabius Township (south)
 Wells Township, Appanoose County (southwest)
 Washington Township, Appanoose County (west)

Cemeteries
The township contains eight cemeteries: Bell, Bethel, Evergreen, Hetzler, John, Mount Moriah, Shinn and West Grove.

Major highways
 U.S. Route 63

References
 U.S. Board on Geographic Names (GNIS)
 United States Census Bureau cartographic boundary files

External links
 US-Counties.com
 City-Data.com

Townships in Davis County, Iowa
Townships in Iowa